Mike A. Ford (born 18 November 1965) is an English rugby union coach, and former professional rugby league footballer. He was named as the director of rugby for Dallas Griffins in Major League Rugby, which is planned to begin in 2020.  In March 2019 he joined Leicester Tigers as a temporary assistant coach for the remainder of the 2018–2019 Premiership Rugby season.

Background
Ford was born in Oldham, Lancashire, England. He was a pupil at Saddleworth School in Uppermill, Greater Manchester, from 1976 to 1981, where he was taught, and coached by Phil Larder. Larder later recommended Ford to Ireland when Larder was defence coach of England.

Three of his sons play rugby union – George plays for Leicester Tigers, and England, and Joe for Yorkshire Carnegie. His youngest son Jacob was the attack coach for Loughborough Students before being named as head coach for Westcliff Rugby Club In August 2019.

Playing career
He won 10 caps for Great Britain.

Ford played  in Wigan's 14–8 victory over New Zealand in the tour match on Sunday 6 October 1985.

Ford played in Castleford's 12–28 defeat by Wigan in the 1992 Challenge Cup Final.

Ford is a Castleford Tigers Hall Of Fame inductee.

Ford moved to South Queensland Crushers but played just 15 games there.

Ford made his début for Warrington on Wednesday 1 November 1995, and he played his last match for Warrington on Monday 8 April 1996, he made his début for Wakefield Trinity during the 1996 season, and he played his last match for Wakefield Trinity during the 1997 season.

Coaching career
In 1999, Ford joined Bramley as a player-coach, and joined Oldham in a similar role a year later. He retired from playing in 2001 after guiding Oldham to the championship Grand Final. Whilst at Oldham, he started coaching rugby union at Dukinfield RUFC for 5 seasons, winning a cup and two promotions.

Ford left Oldham to take over as Defensive Co-ordinator of Ireland in January 2002 and stayed for 4 seasons, winning a triple crown and helping guide Ireland to 3rd in the world rankings. In September 2004 he started working as a defence and skills coach at Saracens, before taking over as head coach in August 2005.

He served as a defence coach for the British & Irish Lions midweek team on their 2005 tour to New Zealand, remaining undefeated in 7 games (the test side lost the series 3–0). He left his position with Ireland in September 2005.

In May 2006 Ford became defence coach of England, part of the coaching team that guided England to the 2007 World Cup Final. With Ford as defence coach England conceded the fewest points in the 2009 Six Nations (70) and the fewest tries in the 2010 Six Nations (5), and the fewest tries in the pool stages of the 2011 World Cup.

Deciding not to seek a renewal of his England contract, Ford joined the coaching staff at Bath Rugby. He became head coach at Bath in May 2013 and guided them to a Champions Cup spot and an Amlin Challenge Cup final. In 2014/15 Bath finished 2nd in the Premiership and lost in the Premiership Final to Saracens. Ford was awarded the Aviva Premiership Director of Rugby of the Year award in 2015 while his son George won Player of the Year.
He left Bath in May 2016 after they had finished 9th in the league.

Ford joined Toulon as head coach in October 2016 but left at the end of the 2016/17 season. He then announced his move to the Dallas Griffins. Shortly after he joined Leicester Tigers where he remained until the conclusion of the 2020–21 season.

References

https://www.echo-news.co.uk/sport/17822004.ford-named-new-head-coach-westcliff/

External links
Mike Ford at mikeford.info
(archived by web.archive.org) Profile at thecastlefordtigers
(archived by web.archive.org) England RU profile

1965 births
Living people
Bath Rugby head coaches
Bramley R.L.F.C. coaches
Bramley RLFC players
Castleford Tigers players
England national rugby league team players
English rugby league coaches
English rugby league players
English rugby union coaches
Great Britain national rugby league team players
Leicester Tigers coaches
Leigh Leopards players
Oldham R.L.F.C. coaches
Oldham R.L.F.C. players
Rugby league halfbacks
Rugby league players from Oldham
South Queensland Crushers players
Sportspeople from Oldham
Wakefield Trinity players
Warrington Wolves players
Wigan Warriors players